Bridgestone Golf is a sports equipment company based in Covington, Georgia, United States. The company is a subsidiary of Japanese Corporation Bridgestone. It designs and manufactures a full range of golf equipment including balls, clubs, and accessories utilizing both the Bridgestone and Precept brand names.

History 
Parent company Bridgestone was founded in 1931 by Shojiro Ishibashi and first produced golf balls in 1935. It was not until 1972 that the company's involvement in golf expanded into the manufacture of clubs.

See also
Bridgestone

References

External links
 
 Tiger Woods signs multiyear deal with Bridgestone Golf
 Tiger Woods and the golf ball that (almost) changed it all

Golf in the United States
Manufacturing companies based in Georgia (U.S. state)
Companies based in Newton County, Georgia
Golf equipment manufacturers
Sporting goods manufacturers of the United States
Manufacturing companies established in 1931
Bridgestone